Peggy Sue Got Married is a 1986 American fantasy comedy-drama film directed by Francis Ford Coppola starring Kathleen Turner as a woman on the verge of a divorce, who finds herself transported back to the days of her senior year in high school in 1960. The film was written by husband-and-wife team Jerry Leichtling and Arlene Sarner.

The film was a box office success and received positive reviews from critics. It was nominated for three Academy Awards: Best Actress (Turner), Best Cinematography, and Best Costume Design. In addition, Turner was nominated for Best Foreign Actress at the Sant Jordi Awards.

The title of the movie and the name of the main character refer to the 1959 Buddy Holly song of the same name, which is played over the film's opening credits.

Plot
In 1985, Peggy Sue Bodell attends her 25-year high school reunion, accompanied by her daughter, Beth, rather than her husband, Charlie, who was her high-school sweetheart. She and Charlie married right after graduation when Peggy Sue became pregnant, but have recently separated due to Charlie's infidelity.

At the reunion, Peggy reconnects with her old high school girlfriends, Maddy and Carol. She ignores Charlie when he unexpectedly arrives. The emcee then announces the reunion's “king and queen": Richard Norvik, the former class geek who is now a billionaire inventor, and Peggy Sue. Overwhelmed, she faints onstage while being crowned.

Peggy Sue awakens, only it is now 1960, her senior year of high school. Confused and disoriented, she decides to go home to her parents and act like everything is normal. Hoping that Richard Norvik can shed light on her situation, she befriends him and relates what happened. He disbelieves her story until Peggy Sue begins giving details about the future. She later decides to break up with Charlie. However, she wants to sleep with him after a party, but he panics and reminds her that she rebuffed him the weekend before. He takes her home, but instead of going inside, she goes to an all-night café where she sees fellow student Michael Fitzsimmons, an artsy loner who she always wished she had slept with. As they sit and talk, Peggy Sue learns they have much in common. They leave on his motorcycle and later have sex under the stars.

The next night at a music bar, Michael wants Peggy to go to Utah with him and another female for a polygamous relationship where the two women support him while he writes. She declines, telling him to use their night together as inspiration for his writing. Charlie happens to be singing at the bar, and she sees there is more to him than she realized. Charlie comes off the stage and speaks to a music agent who is there to evaluate him, but the agent is unimpressed.

The next day, Peggy Sue tries to talk to Charlie but he lashes out, upset over failing to secure a record deal. She leaves to say goodbye to Richard, stating that she wants to stop ruining her life and everyone's around her, especially Charlie's, since the reason he stopped singing is because she got pregnant. Richard proposes, but she turns him down, not wanting to marry so young or derail his future. Peggy Sue visits her grandparents on her 18th birthday. Upon learning that her grandmother is psychic, she tells them her story. Her grandfather takes her to his Masonic lodge, where the members perform a ritual to return her to 1985. Charlie enters the lodge and—when lights go out—picks up and runs out with Peggy Sue, leaving everyone inside believing the ritual worked.

Charlie tells her that he has given up singing and has been given 10% of the family business. He then proposes and gives her the locket she was wearing at the beginning of the film. She looks inside and sees baby pictures of herself and Charlie, which resemble their children. Peggy Sue realizes they love each other. They have sex, proving that she would make the same choices again.

Peggy Sue awakens in a hospital back in 1985, with Charlie at her side. He deeply regrets his infidelity and wants her back.  Peggy Sue and Charlie reconcile.

Michael has written a book dedicated to Peggy and a starry night, indicating that Peggy possibly did travel back in time.

Cast

Production

Development
The film was originally going to star Debra Winger and be directed by Jonathan Demme. They had creative differences and Demme left the project, to be replaced by Penny Marshall, who would be making her feature directorial debut. Then Marshall had creative differences with the writers and left the project. Winger then quit out of loyalty to Marshall. (Marshall then made her directing debut with Jumpin' Jack Flash after the original director dropped out.)

Rastar, the production company, offered the film to Francis Ford Coppola, hoping to entice Winger back to the project. In the end, Kathleen Turner became the star. Two of Coppola's relatives were also cast in the film: his daughter Sofia Coppola as Peggy Sue's sister, Nancy; and his nephew Nicolas Cage as Peggy's boyfriend and then estranged husband, Charlie. (Cage has later said he never wanted to play the role, but was asked multiple times by Coppola; he only agreed to take the part if he could play it in an over-the-top manner.)

Shooting
Kathleen Turner stated that Francis Ford Coppola was contractually obligated to finish the film on time or lose final cut privilege. Accordingly the cast and crew worked twenty hours a day, six days a week, to deliver the movie to the studio on time.

Turner has spoken numerous times about the difficulty of working with co-star Nicolas Cage (Coppola's nephew). In her 2008 memoir, she wrote that: 

Turner also criticized Cage for his decision to wear false teeth and to adopt a nasal fry for his character (Cage said he based it on Pokey from The Gumby Show). During an interview in 2018, Turner commented on Cage's nasal voice that: 

In 2008, in response to Turner's claims that he had driven drunk and stolen a chihuahua, Cage sued her for defamation and won. In exchange he received a public apology from Turner, admission from her publisher that the claims were false and defamatory, and a pledge that Turner and the publisher would make a substantial donation to charity.

Release and reception
Peggy Sue Got Married gained a positive reaction from critics, as it currently holds an 87% rating on Rotten Tomatoes based on 30 reviews. The site's consensus reads, "Peggy Sue Got Married may seem just another in the line of 80's boomer nostalgia films, but none of the others have Kathleen Turner's keen lead performance." Rita Kempley of The Washington Post gave the film a positive review, but wrote of Cage's performance: "What mars the movie, aside from the pokey opening and overused theme, is an icky performance by Nicolas Cage as Charlie. He calls it surreal, 'a type of cartoon acting.' Well, he does kind of remind you of Jughead."

The film opened with $6,942,408 and ended up grossing $41,382,841 in the U.S. It was the first box-office success for Coppola since The Outsiders.

In addition to the film's three Academy Award nominations, and Turner's nomination at the Sant Jordi Awards, Turner won the 1986 award for Best Actress from the U.S. National Board of Review of Motion Pictures. This film appeared on Siskel and Ebert's best of 1986 lists.

Peggy Sue Got Married ranks number 17 on Entertainment Weeklys list of "50 Best High School Movies."

American Film Institute lists
 AFI's 100 Years ... 100 Laughs – Nominated
 AFI's 10 Top 10 – Nominated Fantasy Film

Musical adaptation

The film was adapted by Leichtling and Sarner into a full-length musical theater production which opened in London's West End theatre district in 2001. Despite receiving solid reviews and a several million pound advance, 9/11 forced the show to close early.

References

External links

 
 
 
 

1986 films
1980s fantasy comedy films
1986 romantic comedy films
1980s romantic fantasy films
American fantasy comedy films
American romantic comedy films
American romantic fantasy films
1980s English-language films
Films about time travel
Films about weddings
Films directed by Francis Ford Coppola
Class reunions in popular culture
Films scored by John Barry (composer)
Films set in 1960
Films set in 1985
Films shot in California
American Zoetrope films
TriStar Pictures films
1980s American films